Monroe City is a city in Marion, Monroe, and Ralls counties in the U.S. state of Missouri. The population was 2,652 at the 2020 census.

The Marion and Ralls County portions of Monroe City are part of the Hannibal Micropolitan Statistical Area.

History
Monroe City was platted in 1856, and named for its location within Monroe County. A post office called Monroe City has been in operation since 1860.

The Farmers and Merchants Bank Building, St. Jude's Episcopal Church, and Washington School are listed on the National Register of Historic Places.

Geography

Climate

According to the Köppen Climate Classification system, Monroe Ci Two remnants of the 8,000-year old prairie are within a 40-mile radius of the town.ty has a humid subtropical climate, abbreviated "Cfa" on climate maps.

Demographics

2010 census
As of the census of 2010, there were 2,531 people, 1,036 households, and 623 families living in the city. The racial makeup of the city was 89.6% White, 7.3% African American, 0.4% Native American, 0.4% Asian, 0.2% from other races, and 2.1% from two or more races. Hispanic or Latino of any race were 1.5% of the population.

There were 1,036 households, of which 33.5% had children under the age of 18 living with them, 43.5% were married couples living together, 13.0% had a female householder with no husband present, 3.6% had a male householder with no wife present, and 39.9% were non-families. 36.1% of all households were made up of individuals, and 17.2% had someone living alone who was 65 years of age or older. The average household size was 2.35 and the average family size was 3.07.

The median age in the city was 37.9 years. 26.7% of residents were under the age of 18; 7.8% were between the ages of 18 and 24; 23.7% were from 25 to 44; 24.7% were from 45 to 64; and 17% were 65 years of age or older. The gender makeup of the city was 47.4% male and 52.6% female.

2000 census
As of the census of 2000, there were 2,588 people, 1,061 households, and 661 families living in the city. The population density was 837.1 people per square mile (323.4/km2). There were 1,182 housing units at an average density of 382.3 per square mile (147.7/km2). The racial makeup of the city was 89.34% White, 8.85% African American, 0.04% Native American, 0.15% Pacific Islander, 0.35% from other races, and 1.28% from two or more races. Hispanic or Latino of any race were 0.43% of the population.

There were 1,061 households, out of which 31.6% had children under the age of 18 living with them, 47.1% were married couples living together, 11.7% had a female householder with no husband present, and 37.7% were non-families. 34.0% of all households were made up of individuals, and 15.8% had someone living alone who was 65 years of age or older. The average household size was 2.35 and the average family size was 3.04.

In the city, the population was spread out, with 26.3% under the age of 18, 7.7% from 18 to 24, 25.2% from 25 to 44, 21.9% from 45 to 64, and 19.0% who were 65 years of age or older. The median age was 38 years. For every 100 females, there were 84.9 males. For every 100 females age 18 and over, there were 80.5 males.
o
The median income for a household in the city was $30,377, and the median income for a family was $38,750. Males had a median income of $28,947 versus $20,114 for females. The per capita income for the city was $14,937. About 7.3% of families and 11.0% of the population were below the poverty line, including 10.4% of those under age 18 and 9.7% of those age 65 or over.

Education
Public education in Monroe City is administered by Monroe City R-I School District.

Monroe City has a lending library, the Monroe City Public Library.

Notable people
 Helen Cornelius, country music singer-songwriter and actress
 Henderson Forsythe, (1917–2006), actor
 Belle Johnson, photographer
Kip Kendrick, former member of the Missouri House of Representatives
 Claude T. Smith, instrumental music composer and educator
 Robert "Pinky" Lange, (1921-2006), musician, drummer, specializing in Big Band swing music & Dixieland, played with Elvis A. Presley at the Peabody in Memphis, Tennessee

References

External links
 City website
 Historic maps of Monroe City in the Sanborn Maps of Missouri Collection at the University of Missouri

 

Cities in Marion County, Missouri
Cities in Monroe County, Missouri
Cities in Ralls County, Missouri
Hannibal, Missouri micropolitan area
Cities in Missouri